Nishant Balakrishnan (born 8 June 1980), known professionally by his stage name Nishant Sagar , is an Indian actor who works primarily in the Malayalam film industry. He has performed in over 50 films as a hero, co-star and antagonist.

Career 
Nishant Sagar made his Malayalam film debut in 1997 with Vijay P Nair's Ezhunilappanthal. However, his most notable role came in the 1999 film Devadasi, directed by Biju Varkey. He was then pursuing his graduation. He got a breakthrough in 2000 when Lohithadas cast him in Joker along with Dileep. In 2008, he has acted in an Indo-American movie named Pirate's Blood with Sunny Leone in the lead role, although the film was not released in India owing to distribution problems. Other than Joker, he is mainly noted for his roles in Thilakkam as Gopi and in Phantom as Josekutty.

Filmography

References

External links

Male actors from Kerala
Male actors in Malayalam cinema
Indian male film actors
Living people
1980 births
People from Thalassery
20th-century Indian male actors
21st-century Indian male actors